is a 2008 Japanese film directed by Kiyoshi Kurosawa. It won the award for Best Film at the 3rd Asian Film Awards and received 2008 Asia Pacific Screen Awards nominations for Achievement in Directing and Best Screenplay. At the 2008 Cannes Film Festival it won the Jury Prize of the Un Certain Regard section.

Plot
Tokyo Sonata is about a middle-class family in Tokyo, the Sasakis, which consists of Ryūhei Sasaki, his wife Megumi, and their two sons Takashi and Kenji.

Ryūhei has a good office job, but is suddenly fired because Chinese workers are cheaper. While attempting to find a new job, Ryūhei encounters an old classmate on the street, Kurosu, who has also recently been downsized. Kurosu uses a feature on his mobile phone that plays the ring tone periodically, so that it may fool others into believing he is still employed. This intrigues Ryūhei, who decides to hide the fact that he has been fired from his family. While the two men hopelessly try to find new work, Kurosu's wife slowly begins to suspect her husband's unemployment. Kurosu is later found dead together with his wife from gas poisoning in a double suicide, thought to be initiated by Kurosu.

Takashi, the oldest son, joins the US military and is deployed to war in the Middle East. Kenji, the younger son, wishes to learn to play the piano, even though his father refuses to allow him piano lessons. Kenji takes lessons secretly, and pays for them using his lunch money. Gradually, Kenji develops a strong relationship with his piano teacher, Miss Kaneko, who urges him to pursue his musical ambitions. When his parents find out about Kenji's secret piano lessons, Megumi, who is generally closer to the children, is supportive, but Ryūhei is so furious that he attacks his son, accidentally causing him a minor concussion.

One day, Megumi, while alone at home, is taken hostage by an unemployed man who broke in looking for money. The robber forces Megumi to drive a car he has stolen previously. After a long drive, he allows her leave the car to use the restroom where she has the opportunity to escape. However, she encounters her husband at the mall working in his secret job as a janitor and decides to return to her captor saying that she cannot return home.

That night, Megumi, Ryūhei, and Kenji all have experiences away from home in which they confront the full extent of their existential disquiet.

Kenji attempts to help a friend run away from home, but the latter is caught by his father. Kenji tries to leave town by sneaking onto a bus, but he is caught. Unwilling to answer the questions of the police, Kenji is charged as an adult and kept in a group cell overnight. He is released the following day when the charges are dismissed.

Megumi and the burglar drive to the beach together, where they spend the night in a wood shed. Megumi resigns to the robber's sexual advances, but he ultimately is unable to go through with the act itself. Megumi consoles the robber that he is not a failure, saying that he is the only person who can be himself. Later that night, as the robber sleeps, Megumi spots a strange light on the horizon over the sea. She goes out to look for the light and falls asleep on the beach. The next morning, the robber has driven the stolen car into the ocean, and Megumi returns home.

Meanwhile, as he cleans the bathrooms at the mall where he works, Ryūhei discovers an envelope stuffed with cash behind one of the toilets. He pockets it and encounters Megumi while fleeing the bathrooms, from whom he runs away. Ryūhei then despairingly wanders into the Tokyo night, is hit by a truck, and left for dead. He lies on the side of the street amid some leaves and sleeps there overnight, only to find himself waking up in the morning unharmed. He deposits the envelope of cash in a local lost-and-found bucket, and is the last to arrive back at the house, where the three family members share a meal together without mentioning the events of the previous night.

Four months later, Ryūhei appears to be engaged in his cleaning job. Takashi sends a letter home from the field, noting that he has realized that the U.S military is not the only right side and that he will stay in the Middle East to search for his happiness there. The final scene depicts Kenji performing "Clair de Lune" from the Suite bergamasque at his audition with Megumi, Ryūhei, and his piano teacher watching. His performance is flawless.

Cast
 Teruyuki Kagawa as Ryūhei Sasaki
 Kyōko Koizumi as Megumi Sasaki
 Yū Koyanagi as Takashi Sasaki
 Kai Inowaki as Kenji Sasaki
 Haruka Igawa as Miss Kaneko
 Kanji Tsuda as Kurosu
 Kōji Yakusho as the Robber
 Kazuya Kojima as Mr. Kobayashi

Record of awards and nominations

Reception
Peter Bradshaw of The Guardian gave the film 4 out of 5 stars, while Nick Schager of Slant Magazine gave it 3 out of 4 stars.

Christopher Bourne of Meniscus Magazine said, "Kurosawa's latest film, Tokyo Sonata, is his best in quite a few years, a truly frightening work that achieves its effects without resorting to tired genre mechanics." He also wrote that "Debussy's 'Clair de Lune' may well have never been put to better use in a film."

Meanwhile, Tom Mes of Midnight Eye said: "Tokyo Sonata is the ultimate expression of this quality of Kurosawa's cinema. As mentioned, it contains no supernatural elements, no ghosts, killers, or monstrous flora and fauna. Yet it is without doubt the most terrifying film Kiyoshi Kurosawa has ever made. It is terrifying because it is about us."

References

External links
 

Films set in Tokyo
2008 films
Films directed by Kiyoshi Kurosawa
Japanese drama films
Films about dysfunctional families
Films about music and musicians
Films about families
Asian Film Award for Best Film winners
2000s Japanese films